Sam Barlow (born 7 March 1988) is a Scotland international rugby league footballer who plays for the Bradford Bulls in the Championship.

Background
Barlow was born in Halifax, West Yorkshire, England.

Playing career
Barlow represented England at academy level, and in 2007 he signed a two-year contract with Huddersfield Giants following a trial at the club. He left the club to go to Sheffield on loan after 8 appearances. In August 2009 Barlow left to join Halifax.

In September 2010, Sheffield Eagles threatened legal action against Barlow and Halifax due to a breach of contract. Barlow had been released by Sheffield Eagles on the condition that he did not play against the club during the rest of the season, but this agreement was broken when Barlow played (and scored a try) in Halifax's 42–16 victory over Sheffield Eagles in the Championship play-off semi finals. The clubs later agreed an out-of-court settlement.

Barlow is a Scotland international, having made his début in 2010. He was named in their squad for the 2013 Rugby League World Cup.

He is the brother of the rugby league footballer; Josh Barlow.

On 7 September 2016, Barlow was banned from all sport for four years for assaulting a UK Anti-Doping Agency official in June 2015. The start of the ban as backdated to November 2015 meaning Barlow cannot participate in any sport until November 2019.

In December 2019, Barlow signed a one-year deal with Bradford Bulls following the end of his ban, but suffered a broken arm in a pre-season game against Dewsbury Rams.

References

1988 births
Living people
English people of Scottish descent
English rugby league players
Featherstone Rovers players
Halifax R.L.F.C. players
Leigh Leopards players
Rugby league players from Halifax, West Yorkshire
Rugby league props
Scotland national rugby league team players
Sheffield Eagles players